Lee Jae-jin (Japanese:イ•ジェジン born December 17, 1991) is a South Korean musician and actor. He is a member of rock band F.T. Island, where he serves as the bassist and 2nd vocalist. He has also contributed to F.T. Island's body of work with several compositions of his own.

Music career

F.T. Island

F.T. Triple
In January 2009, members Choi Jong-hoon, Choi Min-hwan, and Lee Jae-jin were put into the sub group "A3". This group debuted at the 2009 New Year concert "My First Dream" held at the JCB Hall in Tokyo, Japan on January 2, 2009. Jae-jin performed as the vocalist and bassist. The group's name was "A3" due to each of the three members having type A blood. This group was formed to help take up some singing time during their concerts, so that main vocalist, Lee Hongki, would not overstrain his voice.

In late 2009, A3 was renamed F.T. Triple and began working with Lee Jae-jin on guitar instead of bass. They released the single "Love Letter" and began performing on music shows. During this time, F.T. Island's main vocalist Lee Hongki was busy filming a drama and guitarist Song Seung-hyun was involved in several variety shows.

Acting career
He made his acting debut in the 2007 KBS2 sitcom Unstoppable Marriage. Lee Jae-jin was a main cast member while the other members made a cameo appearance. In the sitcom, he played the role of Wang Sa-baek (Sim Mal-yeon's fourth son), and appeared regularly on the show.

He also did a cameo in Style [Ep6] (SBS, 2009) and On Air (SBS, 2008).

In 2009 he was cast for the main role in the musical Sonagi, which is based on the classic Korean short story "Sonagi" written by Hwang Sun-won. He got the role as a young boy.

In 2013 he was cast in a Korean production of High School Musical along with AOA member Choa.

In 2021, Lee starred in the stage play Vampire Arthur, a stage play following Lee's discharge from military service.

Personal life
Lee Jae-jin's older sister, Lee Chae-Won was cast in the SBS drama On Air, where she played the make-up artist for Oh Seung-ah (Kim Ha-neul).

On January 21, 2020, Lee Jae-jin began his mandatory military service. He is the second FT Island member to enlist, after FT Island member Lee Hong-gi enlisted on September 30, 2019.  On August 1, 2021, Lee was discharged from military service.

Discography

Albums
 2019: Scene. 27 (Japanese)

Soundtrack contributions

Filmography

Films

Television series

Variety/Reality shows

Theater

References

External links
 F.T. Island's Official website

 

1991 births
Living people
FNC Entertainment artists
South Korean male idols
South Korean pop rock singers
F.T. Island members
South Korean male singers
South Korean male film actors
South Korean male television actors
South Korean guitarists
School of Performing Arts Seoul alumni
Kyung Hee Cyber University alumni